Amblyseius leonardi is a species of mite in the family Phytoseiidae.

References

leonardi
Articles created by Qbugbot
Animals described in 1989